The 2022–23 National Basketball League (Bulgaria) season is the 82nd season of the Bulgarian NBL. The season will be contested by eleven teams.

Teams
CSKA Sofia returned to the league as winners of the second division, after a 12 year absence from the NBL.

Regular season

League table
</onlyinclude>

Results

Playoffs

Bracket

Player of the round

Bulgarian clubs in European competitions

NBL clubs in regional competitions

References

National Basketball League (Bulgaria) seasons
Bulgarian